Denis Van Akiyama (May 28, 1952 – June 28, 2018) was a Canadian actor, best known as providing the voice of Iceman/Bobby Drake, Silver Samurai/Kenuichio Harada and Sunfire in X-Men and Malachite in the original English version of Sailor Moon. He played Shinji in Johnny Mnemonic.

Personal life, career and death
Akiyama was born in Toronto, Ontario, Canada to a Japanese family. He was also a frequent guest star on Katts and Dog as well as voiced and played a number of role in The Adventures of Tintin animated series and Mayday. In 2015, he appeared in the feature film Pixels. Akiyama was also a gifted musician having played trumpet in The Pukka Orchestra.

Akiyama died on June 28, 2018, from a "very rare and aggressive cancer". He and his wife Danielle had two children, Kintaro and Miya. He was 66 years old.

Filmography

Film

Television

Video games

References

External links

Denis Akiyama Memorial Website

1952 births
2018 deaths
Canadian male actors of Japanese descent
Canadian male film actors
Canadian male television actors
Canadian male video game actors
Canadian male voice actors
Male actors from Toronto
20th-century Canadian male actors
21st-century Canadian male actors